Subhan Awan is a Pakistani actor and model. He is known for his roles in Tum Se Kehna Tha, Roag, Wehshi, Saza e Ishq, and Tinkay Ka Sahara.

Early life 
Subhan was born in 1996 on 5 May in Karachi, Sindh at Pakistan. He completed his studies from NED University of Engineering & Technology and graduated with Textile Engineering.

Career 
After completing his studies then he shared some of his pictures with 'Citrus Talent'. In 2018 he started working as a model and worked in many commercials Zong Circle, English Toothpaste, Q- Mobile and Djuice. He started getting attention after he did the video and photo shoot with Almirah.

He also did modeling for brands Amir Adnan, HSY, Nomi Ansari, Noman Arfeen, Al Karam, Gul Ahmed, Oxford, Lawrance Pur and He also did modeling for Noir a Bangladeshi clothing brand.

He made his debut as an actor in drama Noor. Then he appeared in several dramas Muthi Bhar Chahat, Qismat, Saza e Ishq, Tehra Aangan, Tinkay Ka Sahara and Wehshi.

Personal life 
He married model and actress Washma Fatima in 2023 on January 4.

Filmography

Television

Web series

Awards and nominations

References

External links 
 

1996 births
Pakistani male models
Living people
21st-century Pakistani male actors
Pakistani male television actors